Harry Grey, 4th Earl of Stamford (18 June 1715 – 30 May 1768) was an English peer, styled Lord Grey from 1720 to 1739.

Harry Grey was born at Enville Hall, the eldest son of Henry Grey, 3rd Earl of Stamford. He was educated at Rugby and Westminster.

In 1736, he married Lady Mary Booth, the only daughter and heiress of George, 2nd Earl of Warrington. They had three children:
George Harry Grey, 5th Earl of Stamford (1737–1819)
Hon. Booth Grey (1740–1802), the MP for Leicester from 1774 to 1784, married, with a son and daughter
Hon. John Grey (1743 – 12 July 1802), married and had issue

In 1738, he represented Leicestershire in the British House of Commons, but entered the House of Lords in 1739 upon inheriting the earldom. On 3 March 1744, he was appointed a Deputy Lieutenant of Lincolnshire, and on 8 March, of Staffordshire too.

He had inherited the Grey estates at Bradgate Park in Leicestershire and Enville in Staffordshire but decided to make Enville Hall the family seat. Bradgate House was therefore bricked up and the park there kept for hunting and game. The Enville grounds (750 acres) were significantly re-landscaped during the mid-18th century. Mary, Countess of Stamford also inherited large estates at Dunham Massey in Cheshire and Stalybridge in Lancashire on the death of her father in 1758.

He died at Enville Hall and was succeeded in the earldom by his son (George) Harry, 5th Earl of Stamford (later Earl of Stamford and Warrington).

See also
 Booth baronets

References

External links
 www.burkespeerage.com

 

1715 births
1768 deaths
18th-century English nobility
Grey, Harry Grey, Lord
Deputy Lieutenants of Lincolnshire
Deputy Lieutenants of Staffordshire
Grey, Harry Grey, Lord
People educated at Rugby School
People educated at Westminster School, London
Harry
Earls of Stamford
Barons Grey of Groby